Maire may refer to:

Places  
 Maire, Netherlands, a former municipality
 Maire de Castroponce, a municipality located in the province of Zamora, Castile and León, Spain
 Château Saint-Maire, a castle in Lausanne, Switzerland
 Lougé-sur-Maire, a commune in the Orne department in north-western France

Plants 
 Black maire (Nestegis cunninghamii), a large tree endemic to New Zealand
 Coastal maire (Nestegis apetala), a small tree endemic to New Zealand
 Narrow-leaved maire (Nestegis montana) - a tree endemic to New Zealand
 Swamp maire (Syzygium maire), a tree endemic to New Zealand
 White maire (Nestegis lanceolata), a tree endemic to New Zealand

Mairé 
 Mairé, a commune in the Vienne department in the Poitou-Charentes region in western France
 Mairé-Levescault, a commune in the Deux-Sèvres department in western France
 Junian of Mairé (died 587), founder of Mairé, or Mariacum, Abbey in Poitou, France

Other uses
 Maire (surname), a surname
 Máire, the Irish Gaelic form of the given name "Mary"
 Máire (album), an album by Moya Brennan
 Maire, French language for Mayor

See also 
 Le Maire (disambiguation)